Josué Enríquez (born 9 November 1994 in Guatemala City) is a Guatemalan professional squash player. He has represented Guatemala internationally. As of February 2018, he was ranked number 185 in the world, and number 1 in Guatemala. He won the 2018 Guatemala Open.

References

1994 births
Living people
Guatemalan male squash players
Squash players at the 2015 Pan American Games
Pan American Games competitors for Guatemala